Ladislav "Ladja" Skula (born June 30, 1937) is a Czech mathematician. His work spans across topology, algebraic number theory, and the theory of ordered sets. He has published over 80 papers and notable results on the Fermat quotient.

He obtained his Dr.Sc. degree from Charles University in Prague with a thesis on "obor Algebra a teorie čísel" (On Algebra and Number Theory). In 1991, he was appointed professor at the Masaryk University in Brno, where he is now emeritus professor.

Selected publications

External links
Skula's homepage at Masaryk University

Czech mathematicians
Number theorists
Living people
1937 births
Charles University alumni
Academic staff of Masaryk University